Ingrid Cronin-Knight (born 6 October 1977) is a New Zealand former  cricketer who played as a right-handed batter. She appeared in 3 One Day Internationals for New Zealand in 2008. She played domestic cricket for Auckland, and captained them in the 2007/08 season.

References

External links

1977 births
Living people
Cricketers from Auckland
New Zealand women cricketers
New Zealand women One Day International cricketers
Auckland Hearts cricketers